Full Metal Panic? Fumoffu is a Japanese anime television series directed by Yasuhiro Takemoto and animated by Kyoto Animation. It is the second television series based on the Full Metal Panic! light novel series, and a spinoff of the main series comprising various stories in the short story collections. It aired from August 25, 2003 to November 18, 2003 on Fuji TV. For the North American release, the series was licensed by ADV Films. At Anime USA 2009, Funimation Entertainment announced that it acquired the rights to the first and second series. DVD and Blu-ray sets were re-released on October 5, 2010 and the series made its North American television debut on November 15, 2010, on the Funimation Channel.

The second story of episode 1, "A Hostage With No Compromises" did not air in Japan because it involved child kidnapping when real-life child kidnappings were making headlines at that time. "A Fruitless Lunchtime" was broadcast in its place. "Hostage" and another story "Hostility Passing-by" were later released as OVAs.

Episode list

References

Full Metal Panic? Fumoffu
Full Metal Panic!